Anzor Suadinovich Urishev (born January 23, 1987) is a male Kabardin-Russian wrestler, who competed for the men's freestyle 84 kg at the 2012 Summer Olympics in London. He was eliminated in the quarterfinal rounds, after being defeated by Iran's Ehsan Lashgari, based on the technical score.

Urishev won gold medals each at the 2010 European Wrestling Championships in Baku, Azerbaijan, and at the 2011 European Wrestling Championships in Dortmund, Germany. He is also currently a member of SC Gladiator in his home town Nalchik, being coached and trained by Anzor Tembotov.

References

External links
 

1987 births
Living people
People from Kabardino-Balkaria
Wrestlers at the 2012 Summer Olympics
Olympic wrestlers of Russia
Russian male sport wrestlers
European Wrestling Championships medalists
Sportspeople from Kabardino-Balkaria